
Teoh (also commonly rendered as Teo) is a romanised Chinese family name. It is a romanization of Teochew and Hokkien names, particularly ) (in Standard Mandarin p Zhāng, or in Cantonese: Cheung). It is also rendered as Tiu, Tio, Thio, and Tiew.

Distribution
The romanization "Teo" is the 11th-most-common surname among Chinese Singaporeans, with 46,800 bearers making up 1.9% of that population.

In the United States, the romanization "Tiu" was the most common during the 1990 census, ranked 32,695th overall, and the romanization "Teo" was the most common during the year 2000 census, ranked 26,141st overall.

List of persons with the surname

Teo
 Teo Chee Hean, Singaporean politician
 Nicholas Teo,  Malaysian singer
 Josephine Teo, Singaporean politician
 Charles Teo, Australian neurosurgeon
 Teo Nie Ching, Malaysian politician
 Pete Teo, Malaysian singer songwriter, film composer and filmmaker
 Pearry Reginald Teo, Singaporean film director/producer
 Teo Ho Pin, Singaporean politician
 Clement Teo, Team Manager of the S. League team, Tampines Rover
 Eddie Teo, Chairman of Singapore's Public Service Commission
 Kelvin Teo, Malaysian entrepreneur
 Nick Teo, Singaporean Actor
 Gibson Teo, Singaporean Music Producer
 Felicia Teo Wei Ling, Singaporean student who was presumed missing in 2007 before she was revealed to be murdered
 Teo Ghim Heng, Singaporean murderer who killed his pregnant wife and daughter 

Teoh
 Teoh Tiang Chye, Justice of Peace in Malacca
 Teoh Chye Hin, Malaysian secretary general of the Asian Football Confederation (AFC)
 Lina Teoh, or Angelina Teoh Pick Lim, Miss Malaysia, 1998.
 Teoh Beng Hock, Malaysian journalist and political aide
 Rocky Teoh, Malaysian singer and composer. 
 Patrick Teoh, nickname  "Voice of Malaysia", actor and radio personality in Malaysia
 Lina Teoh, Miss Malaysia World 1998/1999 pageant
 Jason Teoh, Malaysian politician, Chairman for MCA Gelang Patah division
 David Teoh, Australian businessman and founder of TPG Telecom.
 Teoh Ze Tong, Star Search series winner
Thio
 Thio Li-ann, Singaporean law professor
Tiu
 Chris Tiu, Filipino basketball player
 Kriesha Tiu, Filipino-American singer

References

Chinese-language surnames
Hokkien-language surnames